Matthew Millar (born 5 September 1976) is an Australian professional golfer who plays on the PGA Tour of Australasia.

Career
Millar turned professional in 1999. From 2006 to 2009 he played on the European Tour, having come through all three stages of qualifying school; his best year-end result was 115th on the 2006 Order of Merit. Millar recorded four top-10 finishes on the tour, with a best finish of joint-fourth place in the 2007 New Zealand Open.

Millar qualified for the 2011 Open Championship through International Final Qualifying, his only appearance in a major championship. He made the cut and finished in 63rd place.

Since 2010 has played primarily on the PGA Tour of Australasia and the OneAsia tour. He has won twice on the PGA Tour of Australasia, winning the Holden New Zealand PGA Championship in March 2015 and the Rebel Sport Masters in January 2018.

Professional wins (2)

PGA Tour of Australasia wins (2)

PGA Tour of Australasia playoff record (0–2)

Results in major championships

Note: Millar only played in The Open Championship.
"T" = tied

Results in World Golf Championships

"T" = Tied

See also
2005 European Tour Qualifying School graduates
2007 European Tour Qualifying School graduates
2008 European Tour Qualifying School graduates

References

External links

Australian male golfers
European Tour golfers
PGA Tour of Australasia golfers
Sportspeople from Wollongong
Sportspeople from Canberra
1976 births
Living people